Okomfo Anokye (c.1655-c.1717?/c.1719) was the first priest (Okomfo) of the Ashanti Empire. Anokye is known for his participation in the expansion of the empire. He was also the codifier of the constitution and laws of the Ashanti Empire.

Biography

Origins and early life
Okomfo Anokye was born in Ghana around 1655. According to Akuapem tradition, he was son of Ano and Yaa Anubea, both from Awukugua in the Nifa Division of the Okere state. His name originated from the following incident:

During his birth in Awukugua, it is said he brought with him gifts from the gods; totem poles which were firmly clinched to his palms that no one could open it; and in the other hand already was a short, white tail of a cow (Podua).

This claim was apparently later confirmed by Otumfuo Nana Osei Tutu II during his visit at Awukugua in 2014.

Founding of the Ashanti Empire

When Osei Kofi Tutu I succeeded to the throne of the Kumaseman State between c.1680 and c.1695 (exact year unknown; although he was definitely Kumasehene by 1695) to the leadership of the small group of Akan forest states around the city of Kumasi, which were already grouped in a loose military alliance, Anokye was his adviser and chief priest. Tutu and Anokye, who must be considered together, carried out the expansionist policy of their predecessors, defeating two powerful enemies, the Akan Doma to the northwest and the Denkyera empire to the south.

The Ashanti conquered large parts of Ghana during the 17th century by overthrowing their powerful overlords, the Denkyira. Okomfo Anokye was essentially a cleric who served to rally the people to the cause of his friend the king. Anokye is also said to have placed a dagger in the middle of the Ashanti region, which the Europeans have not been able to take out with any type of technology for over 500 years.

Unification of the Ashanti people
To throw off the Denkyira yoke required a powerful unity that transcended the particularism of the Ashanti segments, and Anokye employed not only the political influence of his priesthood but also the spiritual ties it engendered to transform the loose Ashanti alliance into a "national" union in 1695.

Anokye and Tutu established rituals and customs of the Ashanti state to diminish the influence of local traditions. They designated Kumasi, the Ashanti capital. They then established a state council of the chiefs of the preexisting states admitted to the union and suppressed all competing traditions of origin. Finally, they reorganized the Ashanti army.

War with the Denkyira 
The War with Denkyira (1699–1701) went badly at first, but when the Denkyira army reached the gates of Kumasi, Anokye's incantations supposedly produced defections among their generals. The Ashanti broke the Denkyira hegemony and captured the Dutch deed of rent for Elmina Castle. This gave the traders of the empire access to the African coast and involved them henceforth in the commerce and politics of the coastal slave trade.

Death
After Osei Tutu's death in 1717, Anokye is said to have returned to Akuapim and died at town called Kyirapatre in Kumase between 1717 and 1719 (aged between 62 and 64). The real cause of his death is not known and it is said that he was going to bring the key to death - and so no one should cry; if anyone is heard crying he will never return. After a couple of days he still was not back and so the women cried, and he never returned.
.

References

External links
"The Great Prophet Okomfo Anokye", GhanaWeb, 31 October 2005.
https://web.archive.org/web/20070820093438/http://www.info-ghana.com/ashanti_empire.htm
"Asantes Of Ghana History". Asanteman Council Of North America ACONA -USA Canada
http://www.doth.com/kwanzaa/africa/ghana/ghana.htm
http://www.cosw.sc.edu/photogallery/ghana2001/pages/Okomfo%20Anokye%2023.htm
"Osei Tutu (d. 1717)". Black History Pages.

17th-century Ghanaian people
Akan religion
Ashanti Empire
Ashanti people
People from Eastern Region (Ghana)
Year of birth unknown
Year of death unknown
Year of birth uncertain